Kaitlyn Michelle Armiger (born June 23, 1991) is a country artist from Sugar Land, Texas, U.S. She was first inspired to pursue country music after winning a Houston, Texas, citywide competition for young country singers. As of 2014, Armiger has released four albums for Cold River Records and has charted seven singles on the Billboard Hot Country Songs and Country Airplay charts.

Career
Katie Armiger's self-titled debut album was released on Cold River Records in the U.S. on August 21, 2007. It was produced by Mark Oliverius, the producer for other country acts such as Lorrie Morgan and Trick Pony. The first seven tracks of her album were co-written by Armiger with Oliverius and Ashlee Hewitt.

Armiger entered the Billboard Hot Country Songs chart for the first time in 2010 with "Kiss Me Now," which reached a peak of number 55. It served as the lead-off to her third album, Confessions of a Nice Girl, which was released in October 2010, and became her first album to chart. It charted on both Billboard Top Country Albums and Billboard Heatseekers. This album was Armiger's first self-titled album and featured nine tracks that Armiger co-wrote with Nashville songwriters. "Leaving Home" and "Best Song Ever" followed as the album's second and third singles, the former failed to chart, while the latter peaked at number 42. Her third album was re-released on September 20, 2011 to include her fourth single, "I Do But Do I", which was released to radio on July 11, 2011. The re-release also included three more new songs, a dance mix of "Best Song Ever", and the music videos for "I Do But Do I" and "Best Song Ever." "Scream," which was released as the fifth and final single from the album in October 2011, peaked at number 47 on the Hot Country Songs chart.

"Better in a Black Dress" was released in mid-June 2012, debuting at number 54 on Billboard'''s Hot Country Songs chart for the week of June 23, 2012. Since then, the song has become her highest charting single. The album that followed on January 22, 2013, Fall Into Me, became her highest charting album to date. It marked Armiger's first entry on the Independent Albums chart (No. 6) and the all-genre Billboard 200 (No. 32). It also became her first top 10 country album, debuting at number 7. The album's second single, "Playin' with Fire", was released February 11, 2013.

Cold River Records later stated that "Katie Armiger has decided to take a breather and decide her next career aspirations".

Discography

Studio albums

Singles

Featured singles

Music videos

References

External links
 
 Hughes, Kim. (July 12, 2007) Houston Chronicle "Faces in the crowd/Sugar Land teen spends summer on the road/Katie Armiger promotes first CD of country music." Section: This week; Page 2.
 Broadcast News (August 8, 2007) Prep-Country Road.'' (reprinted by WQDR-94.7 FM).

1991 births
Living people
People from Sugar Land, Texas
American women country singers
American country singer-songwriters
American child singers
Singer-songwriters from Texas
21st-century American women singers
21st-century American singers
Country musicians from Texas